Strontium Technology Pte Ltd is a PC and flash memory manufacturing company, having its headquarters in Singapore. Today, its operations span to varied territories across Australia, Botswana, New Zealand, South East Asia, Indonesia, Africa, Middle East, Russia, India, US, Canada and Latin America. In total, the company maintains a strong market presence in over 35 countries. Strontium Technology serves an international network of distributors, resellers, retailers and OEM customers.

History
Strontium Technology was founded in 2002 by Mr. Vivian Singh and Mr. Anshuman Gupta, who started the operations in Singapore and gradually expanded to South East Asia, Indonesia, Australia, New Zealand, India and USA. It actively collaborates with Hynix Semiconductor, Micron Technology, Samsung Electronics and Toshiba Corporation, with many of their integrated circuits incorporated into Strontium-branded memory.

Awards and recognition
 2010 - Singapore Top 50

References

External links
 

Manufacturing companies of Singapore
Manufacturing companies established in 2002
Computer memory companies
Privately held companies of Singapore
Singaporean brands
Singaporean companies established in 2002